CINDI, or the Coupled Ion-Neutral Dynamics Investigation is a NASA mission of opportunity payload aboard the C/NOFS satellite. Mission of opportunity is part of the Explorer program.

Its host spacecraft re-entered the Earth's atmosphere in November 2015.

See also
List of heliophysics missions

References

External links
CINDI home page
CINDI in Space comic book

Space science experiments
Explorers Program
Piggyback mission